Viscount Allenby, of Megiddo and of Felixstowe in the County of Suffolk, is a title in the Peerage of the United Kingdom. It was created on 7 October 1919 for the prominent military commander Field Marshal Sir Edmund Allenby, with remainder, in default of male issue of his own, to his younger brother Captain Frederick Claude Hynman Allenby and his heirs male lawfully begotten. The first Viscount's son was killed in action on the Western Front in 1917.

He was succeeded according to the special remainder by his nephew, the second Viscount. The latter's son, the third Viscount, who succeeded in 1984 was one of the ninety elected hereditary peers that remain in the House of Lords after the passing of the House of Lords Act 1999, and sat as a crossbencher. , the title is held by his son, the 4th Viscount, who succeeded in 2014.

The family seat is Newham Lodge, near Hook, Hampshire.

Viscounts Allenby (1919)
Edmund Henry Hynman Allenby, 1st Viscount Allenby (1861–1936)
Lt. Horace Michael Hynman Allenby, MC (1898–1917), only son of the 1st Viscount, killed in action before Viscountcy bestowed on his father.
Captain Frederick Claude Hynman Allenby, CBE, JP, RN (1864–1934), younger brother of the 1st Viscount, next in line through the special remainder.
Dudley Jaffray Hynman Allenby, 2nd Viscount Allenby (1903–1984), nephew of the 1st Viscount, son of Frederick Allenby. 
Michael Jaffray Hynman Allenby, 3rd Viscount Allenby (1931–2014), only son of the 2nd Viscount
 Henry Jaffray Hynman Allenby, 4th Viscount Allenby (born 1968), only son of the 3rd Viscount

The heir apparent is the present holder's son, the Hon. Harry Michael Edmund Allenby (b. 2000).

Family Tree

References

Kidd, Charles, Williamson, David (editors). Debrett's Peerage and Baronetage (1990 edition). New York: St Martin's Press, 1990.

 
Viscountcies in the Peerage of the United Kingdom
Noble titles created in 1919
Peerages created with special remainders